Juan Ángel Martini Sr. (28 December 1915 – 30 January 2005) was an Argentine sports shooter. He competed at the 1960 Summer Olympics and the 1964 Summer Olympics. His son also competed at the Olympics as a sports shooter.

References

External links
 

1915 births
2005 deaths
Argentine male sport shooters
Olympic shooters of Argentina
Shooters at the 1960 Summer Olympics
Shooters at the 1964 Summer Olympics
Sportspeople from Buenos Aires